Thomas King Weldon (1826–1894) was a notable New Zealand police officer. He was born in Cork, County Cork, Ireland or in Carrick-on-Shannon, County Leitrim, Ireland in about 1826.

References

People from County Cork
People from County Leitrim
1826 births
1894 deaths
New Zealand police officers
Irish emigrants to New Zealand (before 1923)
Burials at Dunedin Southern Cemetery